Stig Oskar Sollander (25 June 1926 – 12 December 2019) was a Swedish alpine skier who competed in the 1948, 1952 and 1956 Winter Olympics. He had his best results in the slalom, finishing fifth in 1952 and winning Sweden's first Olympic medal in alpine skiing, a bronze in 1956. He won another bronze in the combined event at the FIS Alpine World Ski Championships.

In 1949, Sollander married Monika Charlotta Sollander; they had six children. Three of them, Stefan, Lena and Lotta, competed nationally in alpine skiing, and Lotta also took part in the 1972 Winter Olympics. Stig died in December 2019 at the age of 93.

References

External links
 
 
 
 

1926 births
2019 deaths
Swedish male alpine skiers
Olympic alpine skiers of Sweden
Olympic bronze medalists for Sweden
Olympic medalists in alpine skiing
Medalists at the 1956 Winter Olympics
Alpine skiers at the 1948 Winter Olympics
Alpine skiers at the 1952 Winter Olympics
Alpine skiers at the 1956 Winter Olympics
People from Östersund
Sportspeople from Jämtland County
20th-century Swedish people